CHIN-FM (100.7 MHz) is a commercial radio station in Toronto, Ontario, Canada.  It broadcasts a Multilingual radio format and is owned by CHIN Radio/TV International. It is co-owned with CHIN 1540 AM and CHIN-1-FM at 91.9 MHz.  All three stations have separate ethnic programme schedules.  The studios and offices are on College Street in the Palmerston-Little Italy neighbourhood of Toronto.

CHIN-FM has an effective radiated power (ERP) of 8,500 watts.  The transmitter is atop the CN Tower.

Programming
CHIN-FM's weekday programming is primarily in Portuguese, Italian, Spanish and South Asian languages.  On weekends, Kurdish, Serbian, Slovenian and Caribbean programming is heard.

History
The previous year, CHIN 1540 began broadcasting ethnic programming, one of the first multilingual stations in Canada. Its owners were granted a construction permit to add an FM station in Toronto with separate ethnic programming.

CHIN-AM-FM were started by Toronto broadcaster Johnny Lombardi and his then-partner James Ditson Service, a former mayor of North York.  They saw a need for multilingual radio for Toronto's growing ethnic communities.

References

External links
 CHIN Radio
 
 

Hin
Hin
Radio stations established in 1967
China Radio International
1967 establishments in Ontario